Selah High School is a public high school located in Selah, Washington, United States, serving students in grades 9–12. It is part of the Selah School District and enrolls approximately 1000 students yearly.

Selah excels in its excellent academics, Career Technical Programs (FCCLA, FFA, TSA) as well as in its sports. The Volleyball and Baseball programs are among the best in their state at any classification. All other Selah sports also compete at a very high level. Selah offers an assortment of classes to prepare kids for their future and takes pride in helping kids achieve their goals.

Notable alumni
 Garret Dillahunt, actor, Deadwood, ER, Terminator: The Sarah Connor Chronicles
 Craig Kupp, former NFL player

References

External links

High schools in Yakima County, Washington
Public high schools in Washington (state)